The Mevlevi Order  is a Sufi order founded by the followers of Rumi below.

Mevlevi may also refer to:

 Mevlevi or Rumi (1207–1273), Persian poet and mystic
 Mevlevi, or Sufi whirling, a ritual associated with the Order